The Greybull River is a tributary of the Big Horn River, approximately  long in northern Wyoming in the United States.

The river was reportedly named for a white buffalo that had been seen on its banks.  Native Americans consider the appearance of a white buffalo a powerful omen.

The river rises near Francs Peak in the Absaroka Mountains in the southwest corner of the Big Horn Basin.  It joins with the Wood River and leaves the mountains near the town of Meeteetse, continuing through the southern parts of Park County and Big Horn County before flowing into the Big Horn River near Greybull.  Much of the upper river is considered a top trout stream, hosting the best genetically pure populations of Yellowstone cutthroat trout in the region.  In 1981, a colony of black-footed ferrets was discovered on the Pitchfork Ranch near Meeteetse. The animal had previously been thought to be extinct.

References 

Rivers of Wyoming
Tributaries of the Yellowstone River
Rivers of Big Horn County, Wyoming
Rivers of Park County, Wyoming